Judge Bright may refer to:

John Bright (judge) (1884–1948), judge of the United States District Court for the Southern District of New York
Myron H. Bright (1919–2016), judge of the United States Court of Appeals for the Eighth Circuit